Samuel Wright Mardis (June 12, 1800 – November 14, 1836) was an American politician and a member of the United States House of Representatives from Alabama. He was born on June 12, 1800, in Fayetteville, Tennessee. He received academic training, attended an "old field school", and studied law. He was admitted to the bar, and he commenced practice in Montevallo, Alabama in 1823. From 1823 to 1825, in 1828, and in 1830, he was a member of the Alabama House of Representatives.

He was elected as a Jacksonian to the Twenty-second and Twenty-third Congresses. He served from March 4, 1831, to March 3, 1835. In 1835, he moved to Mardisville, Alabama in Talladega County and continued the practice of law. He died in Talladega, Alabama on November 14, 1836. He was interred in Oak Hill Cemetery.

Notes

References

1800 births
1836 deaths
Members of the Alabama House of Representatives
Jacksonian members of the United States House of Representatives from Alabama
19th-century American politicians
People from Fayetteville, Tennessee
People from Montevallo, Alabama
People from Talladega County, Alabama